An n-agonal bifrustum is a polyhedron composed of three parallel planes of n-agons, with the middle plane largest and usually the top and bottom congruent.

It can be constructed as two congruent frusta combined across a plane of symmetry, and also as a bipyramid with the two polar vertices truncated.

They are duals to the family of elongated bipyramids.

Formulae 
For a regular -gonal bifrustum with the equatorial polygon sides , bases sides  and semi-height (half the distance between the planes of bases) , the lateral surface area , total area  and volume  are:

Forms 
Three bifrusta are duals to three Johnson solids, J14-16. In general, a n-agonal bifrustum has 2n trapezoids, 2 n-agons, and is dual to the elongated dipyramids.

References 

Polyhedra